KeyedIn Solutions is an international business software company based in Bloomington, Minnesota.

History
KeyedIn Solutions was founded in 2011 by George and Lauri Klaus. George Klaus was previously CEO of Epicor, which was purchased by private equity firm Apax Partners in April, 2011. George Klaus currently serves as chairman of the board for KeyedIn Solutions.  Lauri Klaus, former executive vice president for Epicor, currently serves as the CEO of KeyedIn Solutions.

In December 2011, George Klaus and a group of investors purchased a majority interest in and management of Minneapolis-based Datacom International, an enterprise software company with applications focussing on the manufacturing industry. Datacom was renamed KeyedIn Solutions.

In February 2012, KeyedIn Solutions acquired Atlantic Global PLC, a Yorkshire, UK-based maker of project management and automation software, for $8 million. The products and consulting services from the acquired companies were rebranded as KeyedIn Projects.

References

External links

Software companies based in Minnesota
Software companies of the United States